Palmer v. Thompson, 403 U.S. 217 (1971), is a United States Supreme Court civil rights case which concerned the interpretation of the Equal Protection Clause of the Fourteenth Amendment.

Background
The city of Jackson, Mississippi, closed all of its public swimming pools, as opposed to integrating them. Originally there were five public pools, but the city closed four of them, and surrendered its lease to the fifth pool to the lessor, the YMCA, which continued to operate the pool privately and on a segregated basis. Hazel Palmer, mother of a freedom rider who was arrested at the bus station, and other black citizens filed suit against the city under the Fourteenth Amendment's guarantee of equal protection and under the Thirteenth Amendment, on the grounds that the city's actions created a "badge or incident" of slavery. The lower courts found no constitutional violation.

On appeal to the Supreme Court, the case was argued by Paul A. Rosen and William Kunstler for the petitioners. With them on the briefs were Ernest Goodman and Arthur Kinoy. The case was argued for the respondents by William F. Goodman, Jr.

Holding
The Supreme Court held in its syllabus, "The closing of the pools to all persons did not constitute a denial of equal protection of the laws under the Fourteenth Amendment to the Negroes." The court stated "there was no evidence that the city conspired with the YMCA that its pool be segregated." The court further rejected the equal protection argument that the city's action "was motivated by a desire to avoid integration of the races" because "no case in this Court has held that a legislative act may violate equal protection solely because of the motivations of the men who voted for it."

Legacy
The case was cited by the United States Department of Justice in defending President Donald Trump's travel bans.

References

Further reading
Paul Brest, "Palmer v. Thompson: An Approach to the Problem of Unconstitutional Legislative Motive," Supreme Court Review

External links

1971 in case law
United States Supreme Court cases
United States Supreme Court cases of the Burger Court
United States Fourteenth Amendment case law